, there were about 1,200 electric vehicles in Saskatchewan, accounting for about 0.1% of all vehicles in the province. , 5.2% of new vehicles registered in the province were electric.

Government policy
In its 2021–22 budget, the province of Saskatchewan announced that all electric vehicles will be subject to an annual road usage fee of $150 per-year, the first such fee in Canada, on the justification electric vehicles do not contribute to fuel taxes that are used to fund highway maintenance. The tax has faced criticism from electric vehicle owners and from Regina mayor Sandra Masters for deterring electric vehicle ownership. The fee came into force on October 1, 2021.

, the province does not offer any tax rebates for electric vehicle purchases.

Manufacturing
Saskatchewan has been proposed as a hub for the mining of lithium and rare-earth metals to be used in electric vehicle batteries.

By region

Prince Albert
, there was one public DC charging stations in Prince Albert.

Regina
The first electric vehicles were added to the Regina municipal fleet in October 2022.

Saskatoon
The first electric vehicles were added to the Saskatoon municipal fleet in March 2021.

References

Saskatchewan
Transport in Saskatchewan